The canton of Boëme-Échelle is an administrative division of the Charente department, southwestern France. It was created at the French canton reorganisation which came into effect in March 2015. Its seat is in Roullet-Saint-Estèphe.

It consists of the following communes:
 
Bouëx
Claix
Dignac
Dirac
Garat
Mouthiers-sur-Boëme
Plassac-Rouffiac
Roullet-Saint-Estèphe
Sers
Torsac
Vœuil-et-Giget
Voulgézac
Vouzan

References

Cantons of Charente